Amala Paul (born 26 October 1991) is an Indian actress who mainly appears in Tamil, Malayalam and Telugu films. She made her acting debut by appearing in a supporting role in the Malayalam-language film Neelathamara, and she later became noted for playing the title role in Mynaa.

Career

2009–2010: Early career
After finishing  studies, Lal Jose offered her a supporting role in his film, Neelathamara (2009). Despite emerging a success, the film failed to attract any further offers, as she had anticipated. She pursued roles in Tamil films and went on to sign for the low-budget comedy film Vikadakavi, which was delayed and ultimately became her sixth release, while also signing on to play the lead role in another small budget film Veerasekaran (2010). The film, which became her maiden Tamil release, was panned by critics and went completely unnoticed, while Paul's role was labelled as "minimal", and she later cited that she regretted doing the film and many of her scenes were edited out. Paul then went on to work in Samy's controversial Sindhu Samaveli (2010), portraying the role of Sundari, who has an illicit relationship with her father-in-law. She was approached after the major portions of her next release, Mynaa were ready, and signed on for Sindhu Samaveli before listening to the entirety of the story, claiming that she was shocked but not upset with the controversial scenes which she heard later. The director of the film had previously drawn criticism for his depictions of illicit romances as well as for assaulting his previous lead actress in a film, but Paul played down the issue citing that she had no problem with the director. Upon release, the film met with contrasting reviews, whilst some critics refused to give the film a rating, declaring their disgust at the film's plot. Paul claimed that she received death threats from anonymous callers and was publicly scolded by women at a cinema hall in Chennai.

Paul's next release, the romantic drama film Mynaa (2010), by Prabhu Solomon, made her a recognised actress in the industry. The film had garnered much anticipation prior to release, with noted distributors Udhayanidhi Stalin and Kalpathi S. Aghoram purchasing the rights of the film after being impressed with it. Paul played the village belle Mynaa The film was success at the box office. Paul secured the Vijay Award for Best Debut Actress, while also gaining nominations in the Best Actress category at the Filmfare Awards and the Vijay Awards.

2011–2019: Experimentation and success
Following the success of the Tamil film, Mynaa, Paul became touted as the "new top star of 2011" as she subsequently signed on to several prominent projects. Her first release of 2011 was in a supporting role in the Malayalam drama film Ithu Nammude Katha, a remake of the successful Tamil film Naadodigal, and the second was meant to be her launch in Tamil films, the coming-to-age tale of five friends Vikadakavi, with the film opening to limited screens. Both films opened to limited screens due to the moderate budget of the projects, with her performance in the latter being described as "full of potential". She went on to sign three big budget films with established production houses, with the drama Deiva Thirumagal, directed by Vijay, featuring her opposite Vikram and alongside Anushka, becoming her next release. Her portrayal of school correspondent Shwetha Rajendran won critical acclaim, with a reviewer citing that her "expressive eyes help her leave a mark in a small but important role", whilst another critic claimed that she "acquits herself well". Her final release of 2011 was Ram Gopal Varma's Bejawada, which marked her début in Telugu language films.

Paul's first release of 2012 was in Lingusamy's Vettai, alongside Arya, Madhavan and Sameera Reddy. The film opened to critical and commercial acclaim with The New York Times claiming that the film "entertains without breaking any new ground, though it can also surprise". Paul won mixed feedback for her performance, while the critic from Sify mentioned that she "is lovely to look at and her feisty performance proves that a star is born". Pavithra Srinivasan of Rediff.com cited that she "struts, pouts and hams to the hilt". The actress had three films released on the Valentine's Day weekend of 2012, with Balaji Mohan's bilingual Kadhalil Sodhappuvadhu Yeppadi / Love Failure becoming critical and commercial successes. The film, made in Tamil and Telugu, featured her alongside Siddharth and portrayed her as a college girl, Parvathi, showing her romantic skills. About the Tamil version, a reviewer from The Hindu wrote: "Amala Paul, after coming across as convincing in her last few movies, looks finally set as a leading lady", while another critic labelled that she "comes across as natural" and "it is a pleasure to see her in a role and costumes that suit her age as compared to her recent movies". Rediff.com called the Telugu version of the film "refreshing", highlighting that the lead pair's on-screen chemistry "sparkles". The romantic thriller Muppozhudhum Un Karpanaigal, opposite Atharvaa, also released on the same day in which she played Charulatha, a modern girl based in Bangalore. The film won mixed reviews, though the lead pair's on-screen chemistry was praised by critics, while another reviewer noted that "Amala renders an effortless act". She played a notable role in renowned director Dr. Biju's Akasathinte Niram, which was her first art-house film. The film was screened at the competition section for the Golden Goblet Award in the 15th Shanghai International Film Festival. She paired with veteran Malayalam actor Mohanlal in the film Run Baby Run, in which she played the role of a senior news channel editor. The film was a big commercial success and her performance as well as her chemistry with Mohanlal were highly appreciated.

In 2013, Paul achieved her first commercial success in Telugu cinema. Her first release in 2013, V. V. Vinayak's directorial Naayak, opposite Ram Charan, went on to be one of the biggest critical as well as commercial successes of the year. Her next film was Puri Jagannadh's romantic comedy Iddarammayilatho opposite Allu Arjun. Sangeetha Devi Dundroo of The Hindu commented: "Amala Paul manages to pull off a character that traverses a thin line between being naïve and downright silly. We wish we saw more of her." Another reviewer, Sasidhar AS from The Times of India commented: "Amala Paul's characterisation is a delight, and she plays Komali so effectively that you'll be left wondering who else could have done the role better than her. She was a perfect choice to play a traditional Telugu girl." She was later seen in A. L. Vijay's action entertainer Thalaivaa, opposite Vijay, as a police officer. Her last release of the year was the Malayalam film Oru Indian Pranayakadha. The film was a blockbuster at the Kerala box office and she received several awards for her character Irene, including the SIIMA Award for Best Actress – Malayalam consecutively for two years.

In 2014, her first release was Samuthirakani's Nimirndhu Nil, opposite Jayam Ravi, which was simultaneously shot in Telugu as Janda Pai Kapiraju, in which Nani reprised the role of Jayam Ravi. Her next release Velaiilla Pattadhari, opposite Dhanush was a success in Tamil Nadu and her performance was appreciated.

In 2015, Paul appeared in Rajesh Pillai's Mili, playing the titular role. She then acted in Lailaa O Lailaa. In 2016, she signed for four Malayalam films – 2 Penkuttikal, Shajahanum Pareekuttiyum, Ore Mukham  and Thoppil Joppan, but left the later two projects due to conflicting schedules. Amala also appeared in a Tamil film Amma Kanakku, playing the mother of a 15-year old. She made her Kannada debut in the film Hebbuli, opposite Sudeep. Hebbuli became a great success in the Karnataka box office. Later, she acted in the Malayalam film Achayans, with Jayaram, which was released in May 2017 and became a commercial success at the box office. In later 2017, she had two releases in Tamil Velaiilla Pattadhari 2 and Thiruttu Payale 2 both did well in the box office. Amala had signed to play lead roles in Malayalam films Zam Zam and Kayamkulam Kochunni but later opted out of both as she has signed Tamil films like Bhaskar Oru Rascal (2018), Ratsasan (2018) and Aadai (2019).

2021–present

In 2021, she appeared in anthology film with Kutty Story and Pitta Kathalu. She next seen in web series, Kudi Yedamaithe in Telegu, Ranjish Hi Sahi  in Hindi and Victim: Who is Next? in Tamil. The OTT film, Cadaver (2022), which is an investigative thriller was released on Disney+ Hotstar on 12 August.

Personal life
Paul was born in a Christian family at Ernakulam, Kerala to Paul Varghese (d. 2017) and Annice Paul. Her brother Abijith Paul also appeared in films following Amala's entry into the film industry. After completing her schooling from Nirmala Higher Secondary School Aluva, she took a sabbatical to begin a career in films, but has since joined St. Teresa's College in Kochi, to pursue a B.A. degree in English. Her father had been strictly against Amala pursuing an acting career, but was forced to accept her decision with her brother strongly backing her ambition. She later claimed that she had performing arts in her, revealing that her mother was a singer and her dad was into theatre in college.

Paul had changed her on-screen name to Anakha, on director Samy's insistence, who cited that another actress, Amala had already made her name popular. However, after the failure of her 2011 film Sindhu Samaveli, she reverted to her birth name, since she felt that the replacement had brought her bad luck.

As early as 2011, when Paul was working on Deiva Thirumagal, she was romantically linked to director A. L. Vijay, but denied that the pair were dating. On 7 June 2014, she got engaged to Vijay at Aluva in Kochi. The couple got married on 12 June 2014 at Mayor Ramanathan Chettiar Hall, Chennai. In 2016, Amala and Vijay filed for a divorce due to disagreement between her and her in-laws on continuing her acting career. They divorced in 2017.

In January 2018, Paul was arrested for tax evasion. A crime branch investigation had found that she had registered her luxury car in Puducherry with fake documents. Later, the case was closed citing jurisdictional issues.

Filmography

Web series

Television

Awards

References

External links

 

Actresses from Kochi
Actresses in Tamil cinema
Actresses in Malayalam cinema
Living people
Actresses in Telugu cinema
Indian film actresses
21st-century Indian actresses
Malayali people
Female models from Kerala
Indian Christians
1991 births
Filmfare Awards South winners
Actresses in Kannada cinema
Tamil Nadu State Film Awards winners
St. Teresa's College alumni